This article provides details of international football games played by the Georgia national football team from 2020 to present.

Results

2020

2021

2022

Forthcoming fixtures
The following matches are scheduled:

See also
Georgia national football team results (1990–2019)

Notes

References

Georgia national football team results
Football in Georgia (country)
Georgia national football team
2020s in Georgia (country)
2020 in Georgian sport
2021 in Georgian sport